The Padma Multipurpose Bridge, commonly known as the Padma Bridge, is a two-level road-rail bridge across the Padma River, the main distributary of the Ganges in Bangladesh.
It connects Louhajang Upazila of Munshiganj and Zazira Upazila of Shariatpur and a small part of Shibchar Upazila of Madaripur, linking the less developed southwest of the country to the northern and eastern regions. The bridge was inaugurated on 25 June 2022 by the Prime Minister Sheikh Hasina.

The bridge is considered to be the most challenging construction project in the history of Bangladesh, the steel truss bridge carries a four-lane highway on the upper level and a single track railway on the lower level. It is the deepest bridge in the world, with piles installed as deep as 127 metres. The construction of the bridge was considered to be especially challenging as the Padma River is among the most ferocious rivers in the world.

The bridge is expected to boost the GDP of Bangladesh by as much as 1.2 percent.

History
It was reported by Daily Purbadesh in 1971 that a team of survey experts from Japan submitted a feasibility report for the construction of the Dhaka–Faridpur road to the East Pakistan (now Bangladesh). As part of the construction of the road, they suggested building a bridge over the Padma river. After the liberation of Bangladesh, Sheikh Mujibur Rahman, the first president of Bangladesh, announced the construction of a bridge over the river Padma, but due to his death, the project was not implemented.

On 18 September 1998, a project worth Tk. 3,843.50 crore was proposed for the construction of a bridge over the Padma River on the Dhaka-Mawa-Bhanga-Khulna Highway with the aim of establishing direct communication between the capital and the south and southwest of the country.  At 5 km long and 18.10 m wide, this bridge is considered to be the longest possible bridge in the country.  Construction was proposed to begin in July 1999 and be completed in June 2004. The proposed amount of Taka 2,893.50 crore was from foreign sources and Taka 750 crore from local sources.

The foundation stone for Padma Bridge was laid by Prime Minister Sheikh Hasina on 4 July 2001. However, the BNP under the leadership of Khaleda Zia returned to power following the 2001 general election and decided to discontinue the project.

In the 2006-2007 Annual Development Program, the then Government of Bangladesh adopted a plan to build the Padma Multipurpose Bridge.

The Bangladesh Bridge Authority (BBA) invited the pre-qualification tender for the project in April 2010. Construction of the bridge was expected to commence by early 2011 and be ready for major completion in 2013 (and complete all sections by late 2015).

After allegations of corruption by some people associated with the project's preparation, the World Bank withdrew its commitment and other donors followed. The government of Bangladesh then decided to fund the project itself.

China proposed building the bridge on the build-operate-transfer (BOT) basis by investing $2 billion or 70 percent of the project cost. Four companies—China Major Bridge Engineering Company, Daelim-L&T JV and Samsung C&T Corporation—purchased the tender papers. However, only the Chinese company submitted their financial proposal on 24 April 2014.

On 17 June 2014, important progress had been made in the construction of the Padma Multipurpose Bridge. A construction firm, China Major Bridge Engineering Company Ltd, was selected to construct the long aspired bridge on the river Padma.

Following the withdrawal of pledged funds by the World Bank, the project was ultimately funded directly by the Bangladesh government, with expenditures derived primarily from the central government budget.

Overview of project
The detailed design of the Padma Multipurpose Bridge is being delivered by a team of international and national consultants headed by AECOM. The team comprises AECOM, SMEC International, Northwest Hydraulic Consultants and ACE Consultants, with additional assistance from Aas-Jakobsen and HR Wallingford.

The project comprises two phases. Phase 1 includes the Design Phase leading through procurement action to the award of construction contracts. Phase 2 is the Construction Phase. Phase 1 commenced on 29 January 2009. A dedicated project office was set up in Dhaka in March 2009. The detailed design of the main bridge was carried out in AECOM's Hong Kong office. All work carried out by the design team was carried out within the framework of AECOM's Quality Management System (QMS) which is independently accredited to AS/NZS ISO 9001. The QMS is designed to control all project work undertaken by the team. A project-specific design management plan was established at the outset of the project. In March 2009, the government of Bangladesh requested AECOM to accelerate the design to complete construction by the end of 2013. This necessitated the mobilization of additional personnel within the design team. Bangladesh Bridge Authority (BBA) established an internationally recognized panel of experts comprising five national and five international experts to review the design at regular intervals. In addition, an independent checking engineer, Flint & Neill, was engaged to review the design criteria, specification and drawings produced by the design team to ensure the design meets the project requirements and to undertake an independent check of the detailed design of the main bridge and river training works.

A key feature of the detailed design was the integration of Bangladesh counterparts into the design team, which allowed the successful training of a significant number of Bangladesh personnel in all aspects of the project and the subsequent transfer of the high level of technology involved in this large, complex project.

Components of the project:                                                                                           
 Main bridge
 River training works (RTW)
 Janjira approach road & selected bridge end facilities
 Mawa approach road & selected bridge end facilities
 Service area - 2
 Resettlement
 Environment
 Land acquisition
 CSC (main bridge & RTW)
 CSC (approach roads & service area - 2)
 Engineering support & safety team (ESST)Main bridge : Contractor: China Major Bridge Engineering Co. Ltd, China
 Contract period: 4 years + 1 years (defect liability period)
 Contract cost: BDT: 12,133.39 crore
 Date of work order: 26 November 2014
 Date of completion: 10 December 2020
 Physical progress of work: 100%River training works  length: Contractor: Sinohydro Corporation Limited, China
 Contract period: 4 years + 1 years (defect liability period)
 Contract cost: BDT: 9,400 crore
 Date of work order: 31 December 2014
 Date of completion: 30 June 2022
 Physical progress of work: 100%Janjira approach road & selected bridge end facilities  length: Contractor: AML-HCM JV
 Contract period: 3 years + 1 year (defect liability period)
 Contract cost: BDT: 1097.40 crore
 Date of work order: 8 October 2013
 Date of completion: 31 October 2016
 Physical progress of work: 100%Mawa approach road & selected bridge end facilities  length: Contractor: AML-HCM JV
 Contract period: 2.5 years + 1 year (defect liability period)
 Contract cost: BDT: 193.40 crore
 Date of work order: 27 January 2014
 Date of completion: 31 July 2017
 Physical progress of work: 100%Service area-2: Contractor: Abdul Monem Ltd
 Contract period: 2.5 years + 1 year (defect liability period)
 Contract cost: BDT: 208.71 crore
 Date of work order: 12 January 2014
 Date of completion: 31 July 2017
 Physical progress of work: 100%Resettlement: Total additional grant: BDT: 645.95 crore (up to September 2019)
 Total no. of plots: 2752
 2418 plots handed over to the PAP (up to September 2019)
 Date of work order: 1 June 2009
 Date of completion: 30 June 2020Environment: Total no. of trees planted: 1,69,957
 Date of work order: 1 June 2009
 Date of completion: 30 June 2021Land acquisition: Total land acquisition:
 Munshiganj: acquired: 329.64 hectares, handed over: 319.92 hectares
 Madaripur: acquired: 1601.19 hectares, handed over: 553.18 hectares
 Shariatpur: acquired: 610.96 hectares, handed over: 579.95 hectares
 Date of work order: 1 August 2006
 Date of completion: 31 December 2019CSC (main bridge & RTW): Consultant: Korea Expressway Corporation, South Korea & Associates
 Contract period: 4 years + 1 years (defect liability period)
 Contract cost: BDT: 383.15 crore
 Date of signing contract: 3 November 2014
 Date of completion: 30 November 2019
 Progress of work: 100%CSC (approach road & service area): Consultant: Special Works Organization (SWO-West), Bangladesh Army in association with Bureau of Research, Testing and Consultation of BUET
 Contract period: 3 years + 1 year (defect liability period)
 Contract cost: BDT: 133.49 crore
 Date of work order: 13 October 2013
 Date of completion: 31 October 2018
 Progress of work: 100%Engineering Support & Safety Team (ESST):' ESST: Bangladesh Army
 Contract period: 4 years + 1 years (defect liability period)
 Contract cost: BDT: 72.14 crore
 Date of work order: 13 October 2013
 Date of completion: 31 October 2018
 Progress of work: 100%

 Construction and development 

As of May 2021, more than 95% of the construction (all the main steel frame spans were set on the piers) of the 6.15-kilometre-long two-tier Padma Multipurpose Bridge had been completed. The China Major Bridge Engineering Corporation (MBEC), which was appointed for the main bridge, is carrying out the work. The bridge have a total of 42 pillars. Each have six piles beneath. Steel spans was placed on the pillars. The bridge have a total of 41 spans.

Work on the Padma Multipurpose Bridge is broadly divided into five parts—the main bridge, river training, two link roads and infrastructure (service area) construction. China's Sinohydro Corporation was appointed for the river training works while Bangladesh's Abdul Monem Limited was given the contract for the two link roads and infrastructure construction.

In October 2017, more than one and a half years after the main construction work began, the first span was installed between pillars 37 and 38, indicating timely progress on the project.

On 27 November 2020, construction of all 42 pillars had been completed.

The final (41st) span of the bridge was installed on 10 December 2020 at 12:02 PM.

The last road slab was installed on the span that linked pillars 12 and 13 of the Padma bridge on 24 August 2021 at 10:12 AM.

The bridge was officially inaugurated by the prime minister of Bangladesh, Sheikh Hasina, on 25 June 2022.

Opening ceremony
An elaborate ceremony was conducted for the opening of Padma Bridge, signifying the national significance of the bridge. The Prime Minister, Sheikh Hasina unveiled a plaque at the Mawa point commemorating the construction of the bridge followed by special prayers. After the inauguration, Hasina paid the first toll of the bridge, ৳750 and ৳16,400 for the rest of her fleet. The motorcade stopped while on the bridge and watched an aerobatics display conducted by the Bangladesh Air Force. Upon concluding the journey across the bridge, a programme which included a keynote speech from the Prime Minister was overseen. A commemorative ৳100 note was released featuring an image of the Bridge. Celebrations were held concurrently in the diplomatic missions of Bangladesh located around the world.

Controversy and rumours

From the beginning, the Padma Multipurpose Bridge negotiation was involved in controversy and conspiracy. The World Bank stated that they found "credible evidence corroborated by a variety of sources which points to a high-level corruption conspiracy among Bangladeshi government officials, SNC-Lavalin executives, and private individuals in connection with the Padma Multipurpose Bridge Project." As a result of the alleged corruption, the World Bank initially refused to sanction the proposed loan for constructing the bridge and imposed conditions for the continuation of loan talks with the government. In accordance with one of these conditions Communications Minister Syed Abul Hossain had to resign, as he was alleged to have been involved in the corruption. SNC-Lavalin accepted a negotiated resolution agreement where the company and its affiliates were barred from taking part in bidding for World Bank contracts for 10 years. This is particularly significant as one of the four criteria required before the international donor agrees to a negotiated settlement is "Whether an accused party has admitted culpability". Some assumed that SNC Lavalin had done so.

However, the corruption allegations were thrown out in a Canadian Court on a technicality as initial cause shown before wire tapping suspects was not deemed good enough. Hence, all evidence gathered from the wire tap was discarded. As the case heavily relied on the wire tap evidences, the prosecution decided not to pursuit the case further.

In 2017, former ICC prosecutor Luis Gabriel Moreno Ocampo came to Dhaka to monitor the progress of the alleged Padma Multipurpose Bridge corruption investigation. The World Bank sent a panel of three, headed by Ocampo, to review the steps taken by the ACC in the investigation. As recommended by the panel, the ACC filed a case implicating former Bridges Division secretary Mosharraf Hossain Bhuiyan and six other high-ranking government officials. However, the same Canadian court acquitted three executives of charges that SNC-Lavalin Group Inc staff had planned to bribe Bangladesh officials in the bridge project, on the same technicality mentioned earlier.

Rumours spread on social media platforms like Facebook that human heads would be required in the construction of the Padma Bridge in July 2019. This led to the beating of many people in different parts of Bangladesh and the handing over of them to the police. Later on 9 July 2019, the bridge construction authority sent a notification to the media stating that the incident was rumoured and baseless. Researchers advised the bridge authorities to spread all the details of the construction of the bridge among the people.

Usage and benefits
The bridge will connect Dhaka with Kolkata in a faster way. At least 2 hours journey time will be saved. Southern part of Bangladesh will be connected with Dhaka in a shorter time. Once the bridge is operational, another Kolkata-Dhaka International train via Mawa, Goalando, Faridpur, Kushthia, Poradaho, Darshana & Gede may be introduced.

Tourist spots of Southwestern Bangladesh like Kuakata, Sundarbans and major destinations like Barisal, Faridpur, Gopalganj, Patuakhali, Khulna etc are now easily reachable from capital city of Dhaka.

Toll and revenue

On 28 April 2022, the Bridges Division proposed a toll rate for the Padma Bridge and sent it to Prime Minister Sheikh Hasina for approval. On 17 May, the Ministry of Road Transport and Bridges issued a notification fixing different toll rates for different transports.

The construction cost of the Padma bridge is Tk. 30,193.39 crore. It is estimated that by 2022, the bridge will carry 21,300 vehicles per day in 23 districts of Bangladesh, which will increase to 41,600 by 2025. It will take  years to recover the toll from all of them. According to Jugantar'', citing the World Bank, the revenue from the Padma Bridge in the next 31 years will be 18.5 billion dollars, which is 5.5 times the construction cost. In addition, social progress will add 25 billion dollars to the economy. The land that has been protected through river governance on both sides is worth about Tk. 1,400 crore. The bridge will save Tk. 2,400 crore on electricity, gas and internet lines. The non-operation of the ferry will save Tk. 3,600 crore. According to the agreement, the bridge authority will have to pay Tk. 36,000 crore in the next 35 years. According to the Bangladesh Bridge Authority, most of the money collected from the toll will be used to repay the loan and the rest will be used to maintain the bridge.

On 26 June 2022, a total of about 15,200 vehicles crossed the bridge in the first eight hours after the authorities opened it to the public at 6 am. According to an official from the Bangladesh Bridge Authority, Tk. 82,19,000 toll was collected between 6 am to 2 pm. On 1 July 2022, the government earned record Tk 3,16,00,000 in revenue through toll from 26,394 vehicles that crossed the Padma Bridge, the sixth day after opening of the bridge to traffic.

See also
 99th Composite Brigade, a Bangladesh Army brigade deployed to ensure security of the bridge
 Ganges Barrage Project, another proposed mega-project to combat the water deficiency caused by the Farakka Barrage
 Jamuna Bridge, a similar completed bridge across the Jamuna River
 Sheikh Russel Cantonment, a cantonment built near the Padma Multipurpose Bridge
 List of megaprojects in Bangladesh
 Padma Bridge graft scandal

References

External links

 Bangladesh Bridge Authority, Padma Multipurpose Bridge
 Padma Bridge will Change Destiny of Bangladesh

 
Railway bridges in Bangladesh
Road bridges in Bangladesh
Road-rail bridges
Truss bridges
Toll bridges in Bangladesh
Bridges over the Ganges
Bridges completed in 2022
2022 establishments in Bangladesh